is a train station in Higashiyama-ku ward, city of Kyoto, Kyoto Prefecture, Japan. It is the closest subway station to Eikan-dō Zenrin-ji temple.

Lines
 
  (Station Number: T09)

Layout
The underground station has one island platform serving two tracks.

History

The station opened on October 12, 1997 when the first section of the Tōzai Line opened.

Until the day before the opening of the Tōzai Line, Keage Station on the Keihan Keishin Line on the street served the area from the beginning of the Keishin Line on August 15, 1912.

Surrounding area 

 Westing Miyako Hotel Kyoto
 Nanzen-ji
 Eikan-dō Zenrin-ji
 Philosopher's Walk (Tetsugaku no Michi)
 Lake Biwa Canal
 Keage Incline
 Kyoto International Community House
 Kyoto City Zoo

References

Railway stations in Japan opened in 1997
Railway stations in Kyoto Prefecture